Giovanni Bonello (born 11 June 1936 in Floriana) is a Maltese judge, judge of the European Court of Human Rights from 1 November 1998 until 31 October 2004. As the Parliamentary Assembly of the Council of Europe rejected the names proposed by the Maltese Government, Bonello's term was extended, in terms of article 23 para. 1 3 CON of the European Convention on Human Rights, until 19 September 2010. In 1990, he was nominated Chief Justice and President of the Constitutional Court but declined the appointment.

Bonello has been considered a "liberal" judge. He has  been the first judge whose separate opinions were published during his tenure, later also the separate opinions of the Portuguese judge Paulo Pinto de Albuquerque were also published in Italy. Judge (later Court President) Nicolas Bratza and leading authority on Human Rights Law Michael O'Boyle published them with Wolf Legal Publishers of the Netherlands. His separate opinions were also collected in the book When Judges Dissent, published in 2008.

Bonello has published several history books, some of which led Bonello to be awarded the National Book Prize by the National Book Council. He also served as president for the Malta Historical Society from 2011 to 2015.

Bonello also wrote a series of articles for the Times of Malta, celebrating the life of Caterina Scappi, founder of the first hospital exclusively for women in Malta: "For her absolutely pioneer social commitment, for this revolutionary philanthropy, Scappi deserves the monument she never got. Only an obscure and overlooked tombstone in the Carmelite church in Valletta today bears witness to her existence, her feminist vision and her generous, farsighted altruism."

Upon his retirement from the European Court of Human Rights, Court president Jean-Paul Costa said “Vanni” brought “robust independence of spirit and unflagging commitment to the protection of human rights”. He displayed such qualities time and again in numerous separate opinions given in his unique and memorable style, which was “elegant as it is forceful”, using “vocabulary as rich as it is rare”. In fact, his opinions led Judge Bonello to attain “near-legendary” status among all those who followed Strasbourg case law, he said. President Costa said Judge Bonello was a true gentlemen who gained the respect and affection of all those who worked with him, whether they agreed with him or not. He was a marvellous ambassador for his profession and his country. “Along with his professional achievements, Vanni is a man of broad and deep culture, a connoisseur of great art and a distinguished historian. Now that he can finally take his leave of the Court, he can and will dedicate himself more fully to these intellectual and aesthetic pursuits.” The president recounted an anecdote about the man he befriended during his long term at the Court. He said he had tried making a modest personal contribution to Judge Bonello’s historical studies about the French occupation of Malta during the Napoleonic era, however, he soon realised his assistance was almost useless because Judge Bonello knew virtually everything there was to know on the subject.

Awards
Among others:
 2003: Gold Medal of the Malta Society of Arts, Manufactures and Commerce
 Companion of the National Order of Merit
 Cavaliere of the Italian Republic
 Knight of the Sovereign Military Order of Malta
 Insignia of Merit by the Russian Federation for outstanding achievement
 Extraordinary gold medal by the Judiciary of the Republic of Moldova

References

1936 births
Judges of the European Court of Human Rights
Living people
People from Floriana
20th-century Maltese judges
Maltese judges of international courts and tribunals
21st-century Maltese judges